Bankhead House may refer to:

 Bankhead House (Jasper, Alabama), listed on the National Register of Historic Places in Jasper, Alabama
 James Greer Bankhead House, listed on the National Register of Historic Places in Sulligent, Alabama
 Heber K. and Rachel H. Bankhead House, listed on the National Register of Historic Places in Wellsville, Utah